Trent Hoppner (born 19 February 1979) is a former Australian rules footballer who played with Carlton in the Australian Football League (AFL). Plagued by injuries including shoulder problems and a stress fracture of the shin, Hoppner only had the chance to play one game before leaving the club.

Notes

External links

Trent Hoppner's profile at Blueseum

1979 births
Carlton Football Club players
Northern Knights players
Australian rules footballers from Victoria (Australia)
Living people